Waterfall Garden Park, also called UPS Park and UPS Waterfall Park, is a private  pocket park in Seattle, Washington, created in 1978 at the original United Parcel Service building in Pioneer Square. It is open to the public during the day and closed at night. The park was designed by Masao Kinoshita with Sasaki Associates and funded by Annie E. Casey Foundation to commemorate UPS's founder, James Casey. It is described as "one of the most expensive parks per square foot ever built in the United States". Roger Sale says in the guidebook Seeing Seattle that the park is locked at night to keep out the sizeable Pioneer Square homeless population.

The park's Japanese garden includes Chamaecyparis obtusa and other botanicals native to Japan, and a pool designed by Yoshikuni Araki. The garden won the Environmental Award of the American Nurserymens Association in 1981.

See also
History of the Japanese in Seattle
Privately owned public space

References

External links
 
 UPS Waterfall Garden Park at Atlas Obscura

1978 establishments in Washington (state)
Downtown Seattle
Japanese gardens in Seattle
Parks in Seattle
Pioneer Square, Seattle
Privately owned public spaces